SS Nubian was a steamer built in 1876 by Charles Mitchell & Co. of Newcastle-Upon-Tyne, England, and was operated by the Union Steamship Company (Southampton Steam Shipping Company) of Southampton, England. A passenger and cargo steamer with a compound engine provided by Thos. Clark & Co of Newcastle-upon-Tyne, she had a top speed of 12 knots. She later was lengthened. From 1876 to 1883, she was used for Cape mail service, and from 1884 she was used for transport between Liverpool, England, Bermuda, and Baltimore, Maryland. In 1887 she steamed to Portuguese East Africa and was used in South Africa from 1888 until 1892. She was lost in the Atlantic Ocean off Lisbon, Portugal, on 20 December 1892.

References

1876 ships
Steamships of the United Kingdom
Shipwrecks in the Atlantic Ocean
Maritime incidents in 1892
Ships built on the River Tyne